Concise Command Language (CCL) was the term used by Digital Equipment Corporation for the Command-line interpreter / User interface supplied on several of their computing systems; its successor was named DIGITAL Command Language (DCL).

CCL provides the user with an extensive set of terminal commands.

The first system to include CCL was DEC's PDP-10.

History
The PDP-6 monitor came with a simple set of commands. To compile and run a FORTRAN program, one would
 .R F4 --- invoke the FORTRAN compiler
 *DTA1:PROG3=DTA2:PROG3,SUB3A,SUB3B  --- specify binary output and source input
 .R LOADER 30  --- invoke the loader, allocate 30K of memory
 *DTA1:PROG3   --- specify binary object to load
 *SYS:/S  --- let the loader find the appropriate subroutine libraries
 .SAVE DTA1:PROG3  --- write the executable to DTA1
(The DOT is a monitor prompt and the Star/Asterisk is an application prompt)

The PDP-10 had CCL. Key to its improvements over its predecessor were:
 multi-step commands: .EX PROG3,SUB3A,SUB3B
 would check to see if any of the 3 needed to be recompiled (and did so if necessary)
 run the object program loader (including needed subroutine libraries)
 start running the program
 advanced command file: .EX @RUNPROG3.CMD
 would run the command(s) in the .CMD file

Commands
The following table contains a list of CCL commands.

References

Command shells